A list of films produced in Argentina in 1976:

External links and references
 Argentine films of 1976 at the Internet Movie Database

1976
Argentine
Films